Oscar Hernandez may refer to:

Arts and Entertainment
 Oscar Hernández Falcón (1891–1967), Cuban guitarist and composer of La Rosa Roja
 Oscar Hernández (musician) (born 1954), Puerto Rican musician

Politics
 Oscar Hernandez (politician), former mayor of Bell, California
 Oscar Ramiro Ortega-Hernandez, suspect in shooting at the White House in 2011

Sportspeople
 Óscar Hernández (footballer, born 1950), Honduran football forward
 Óscar Hernández (tennis) (born 1978), Spanish tennis player
 Oscar Hernández (baseball) (born 1993), Venezuelan baseball player
 Óscar Hernández (footballer, born 1993), Chilean football midfielder
 Óscar Hernández (footballer, born 1994) (born 1994), Mexican football forward

See also
 Oscar Isaac (born 1969), actor and musician, full name Oscar Isaac Hernandez